Josip "Joe" Šimunić (born 18 February 1978) is a Croatian retired footballer and current manager of the Croatia national under-19 team.

Born in Australia to Bosnian Croat parents, Šimunić started his career at Melbourne Knights then moved to Germany where he spent 14 seasons in the Bundesliga with Hamburger SV, Hertha BSC and TSG 1899 Hoffenheim before finishing his career in Croatia with Dinamo Zagreb.

He played for Croatia from 2001 to 2013, appeared in five major tournaments for Croatia – 2002 and 2006 World Cups, as well as the 2004, 2008 and 2012 European Championships – and is the fifth most capped player in the history of the Croatia national team.

Club career
Šimunić was born in Canberra, Australia, to Bosnian Croat immigrants from Otigošće near Fojnica. He received early football training at Croatia Deakin in his hometown of Canberra before attending the Australian Institute of Sport program. The defender broke into the Melbourne Knights first team as a teenager in the 1995–96 season and ended it with a championship medal and 1996 NSL Youth Player of the Year award. Šimunić scored his first goals the following term, three in 14 outings, before moving to Europe to join Hamburger SV in 1997.

Hertha BSC
Šimunić moved to Hertha BSC in 2000 after having fallen out with Hamburg coach Frank Pagelsdorf and has since become an integral member of a team which has enjoyed occasional forays in the UEFA Cup. He expressed on The World Game on SBS that he wishes to return to Australia to live after concluding his career in Europe. At the end of the 2008–09 season, Šimunić was named the best centre-half in the Bundesliga by Kicker. Hertha finished in fourth place that season, with a defence that conceded only 41 goals, tied for third in the league with VfL Wolfsburg.

1899 Hoffenheim
After nine years with Hertha, he left the club on 30 June 2009 to sign with TSG Hoffenheim on a contract which was to run out on 30 June 2012.

Dinamo Zagreb
On 31 August 2011, the board of Dinamo Zagreb confirmed signing of Šimunić on a free transfer in a contract that expires on 30 June 2013. Šimunić was signed by the club in order to re-enforce their team for UEFA Champions League matches. He made his official debut in Croatian biggest derby match, between eternal rivals Dinamo Zagreb and Hajduk Split at Stadion Poljud. During his first season with the club he made only 11 domestic league appearances, as he struggled to find his regular spot in the starting lineup due to injuries and tough competition in the team's defensive lineup that included Tonel, Leandro Cufré, Igor Bišćan and Domagoj Vida. He made his UEFA Champions League debut against Lyon at Stade de Gerland. At the end of the season he won his first double with the club, as Dinamo won both the Prva HNL and the Croatian Cup.

In the beginning of his second season with the club he established himself as the first choice centre-half and regular starter. He played fully 90 minutes in each of six Dinamo's group stage matches in 2012–13 UEFA Champions League.

On 14 December 2014, Šimunić officially retired from professional football.

International career
Šimunić was educated at the Australian Institute of Sport (AIS). He was eligible to play for Australia but opted to play for Croatia, even though his parents were from Bosnia and Herzegovina and not Croatia, albeit of Croatian ethnicity. After obtaining dual citizenship in October 2001, he made his international debut in Croatia's friendly match against South Korea on 10 November 2001. Šimunić did not play in any of Croatia's qualifiers for the 2002 World Cup, but was given a place in the squad for the finals after an injury forced Igor Tudor out. He played all three of Croatia's matches in South Korea and Japan. He also played at the 2004 Euros, the 2006 World Cup and the 2008 Euros, performing well in the latter tournament.

In a well-publicised incident, Šimunić was sent off in Croatia's final 2006 World Cup match against Australia. Šimunić having picked up a booking in the 61st minute, English referee Graham Poll took out a yellow card for his tackle in the 90th minute, but did not actually send him off. At the conclusion of the game three minutes later, however, Šimunić remonstrated with Poll and received a "third" yellow card, this time followed by a red card. FIFA initially noted all three bookings in its match report, before later removing the 90th minute (second) booking. This prompted the removal of Poll from the knockout stages referee pool. Shortly after the World Cup, Poll retired from refereeing international games, citing this game as a direct cause. Upon the release of his autobiography in 2007, Poll revealed that, upon booking Šimunić for the second time, he had erroneously recorded him as "Australia #3" (who was defender Craig Moore), due to Šimunić's Australian accent.

Šimunić is known for having had great football technique, despite having been a centre-half. His national teammate Niko Kranjčar said that, "on a training pitch, he did feints like Ronaldinho."

Fascist salute controversy
Šimunić was involved in a controversy following a 2–0 win for Croatia against Iceland in Zagreb on 19 November 2013. He was accused of neo-Nazi sympathies for having directed the crowd in a chant following the game. The use of the salute "Za dom!" (For [the] homeland!), with the fans responding "Spremni!" (Ready!), was identical to the salute used by the fascist Ustaše movement in Croatia during World War II.

He defended his actions saying that he was driven by "love for his Croatian homeland". After the match, Šimunić responded to his critics: "Those who are bothered by those shouts should study history. If it bothers someone, then it's their problem. I'm not afraid." For this incident, Šimunić was fined 25,000 kunas by the State's Attorney Office of Croatia for inciting racial hatred and harassment of other participants of a public gathering. After an investigation FIFA suspended Šimunić for ten official matches, banned him from entering the confines of the stadiums for those ten matches and imposed a fine of CHF 30,000 (around €24,000). Šimunić's behaviour was denounced by the Croatian Minister of Science, Education and Sports Željko Jovanović, the Association of Anti-Fascist Fighters of Croatia (SABH) and various foreign and domestic media. The severity of suspension by FIFA was both criticized and embraced. Jovanović called it expected and deserving, sending a strong message that Croatians do not want to be perceived by Europe as "backward rightists" and as a country where minority rights are being violated to promote and glorify fascism. Others, such as the Croatian Football Federation and national team coach Niko Kovač, have described the suspension as excessive and Draconian. Šimunić appealed to FIFA to rescind his suspension, but lost his appeal in March 2014. His lawyers responded by claiming that a "Greater Serbian conspiracy" was to blame for FIFA's decision.

On 9 April 2014, Šimunić and his lawyers filed an appeal with the Court of Arbitration for Sport (CAS) and requested that the sanctions be cancelled or, alternatively, be stayed for a probation period of one year. The parties were heard at a hearing which took place at the CAS offices on 8 May 2014. The CAS arbitration committee in charge of this matter unanimously rejected the arguments of the player and dismissed his appeal, on 12 May 2014. CAS confirmed the sanction imposed by FIFA against Šimunić, who was remained suspended for ten official matches, the first of which had to be served during the final competition of the 2014 FIFA World Cup and banned from entering the confines of the stadiums for those ten matches and also fined CHF 30,000.

In 2019, Šimunić stated on Sportske novosti: "I wasn't aware of the implications because I hadn't lived in Croatia for a long period of time and I hadn't felt such a division about certain questions, even if they were Za dom spremni'. So, to be very clear, I was not glorifying fascism, Nazism, or any other kind of totalitarianism. I was glorifying Croatia. I was convinced that was the right way. Today I understand there is a lot of those who think that is the wrong way." and "Being aware of the context and everything that had happened, today I would chant 'Croatia, Croatia'".

Coaching career
On 22 September 2015, Šimunić was appointed an assistant manager of the Croatia national football team under the coaching staff of Ante Čačić, who was sacked in October 2017.

On 10 May 2019, he became a new manager of the Croatia national under-19 football team.

Personal life
Šimunić is married to Christina Koloper, a Croatian Canadian. On 5 September 2014, Koloper gave birth to the couple's first child. The child passed away in 2018.

On 24 August 2015, President and Armed Forces Commander-in-Chief Kolinda Grabar-Kitarović was presented with a petition for the introduction of Za dom spremni to the official use in the Croatian Armed Forces. One of the petition signatories was Šimunić, alongside other prominent Croatian right-wing figures such as Josip Pečarić, Valentin Pozaić, Vlado Košić, Mirko Valentić, Zvonimir Šeparović, Nikola Štedul etc. President Grabar-Kitarović immediately rejected the petition, calling it "frivolous, unacceptable and provocative".

Šimunić donated for the production of the 2016 Croatian documentary Jasenovac – istina'' that denies the Ustasha genocide of Serbs and Jews in the Jasenovac concentration camp during the World War II.

Career statistics

Club
Sources:  

International
Sources:

International goals
Source:

Honours

ClubMelbourne Knights National Soccer League: 1995–96Herta BSCDFL-Ligapokal: 2001, 2002Dinamo Zagreb'''
 Prva HNL: 2011–12, 2012–13, 2013–14
 Croatian Cup: 2012
 Croatian Supercup: 2013

See also
List of footballers with 100 or more caps

References

External links

1978 births
Living people
Sportspeople from Canberra
Soccer players from the Australian Capital Territory
Australian people of Bosnia and Herzegovina descent
Australian people of Croatian descent
Australian emigrants to Croatia
Association football central defenders
Australian soccer players
Australian expatriate soccer players
Croatian footballers
Croatia international footballers
Expatriate footballers in Germany
2002 FIFA World Cup players
2006 FIFA World Cup players
UEFA Euro 2004 players
UEFA Euro 2008 players
UEFA Euro 2012 players
Hamburger SV players
Hamburger SV II players
Hertha BSC players
TSG 1899 Hoffenheim players
Melbourne Knights FC players
GNK Dinamo Zagreb players
National Soccer League (Australia) players
Bundesliga players
Croatian Football League players
Australian Institute of Sport soccer players
FIFA Century Club
FIFA World Cup controversies
Croatian Holocaust deniers
Deniers of the genocide of Serbs in the Independent State of Croatia
Croatian nationalists
Citizens of Croatia through descent
Australian expatriate sportspeople in Germany
Croatian expatriate sportspeople in Germany
Croatian expatriate footballers